Ring Mountain, also called Crucible Dome, is a tuya in the Mount Cayley volcanic field, British Columbia, Canada. It has a horseshoe shaped crater, located on the east side of the upper Squamish River. Outcrops on Ring Mountain's western side contain highly variable, fine-scale jointing and are locally broken down into many small spires and knobs. The age of Ring Mountain is unknown, but probably formed during the Fraser Glaciation like most tuyas in Canada.

See also
 Mount Cayley
 Garibaldi Volcanic Belt
 Cascade Volcanoes
 Volcanism of Canada
 Volcanism of Western Canada

References

External links
 Catalogue of Canadian volcanoes: Ring Mountain

Two-thousanders of British Columbia
Volcanoes of British Columbia
Holocene volcanoes
Pleistocene volcanoes
Mount Cayley volcanic field
Tuyas of Canada
Quaternary British Columbia